In the area of modern algebra known as group theory, the baby monster group B (or, more simply, the baby monster) is a sporadic simple group of order

   241313567211131719233147
 = 4154781481226426191177580544000000
 = 4,154,781,481,226,426,191,177,580,544,000,000
 ≈ 4.

B is one of the 26 sporadic groups and has the second highest order of these, with the highest order being that of the monster group. The double cover of the baby monster is the centralizer of an element of order 2 in the monster group. The outer automorphism group is trivial and the Schur multiplier has order 2.

History
The existence of this group was suggested by Bernd Fischer in unpublished work from the early 1970s during his investigation of {3,4}-transposition groups: groups generated by a class of transpositions such that the product of any two elements has order at most 4. He investigated its properties and computed its character table. The first construction of the baby monster was later realized as a permutation group on 13 571 955 000 points using a computer by Jeffrey Leon and Charles Sims.  Robert Griess later found a computer-free construction using the fact that its double cover is contained in the monster group.  The name "baby monster" was suggested by John Horton Conway.

Representations
In characteristic 0, the 4371-dimensional representation of the baby monster does not have a nontrivial invariant algebra structure analogous to the Griess algebra, but  showed that it does have such an invariant algebra structure if it is reduced modulo 2.

The smallest faithful matrix representation of the Baby Monster is of size 4370 over the finite field of order 2.

 constructed a vertex operator algebra acted on by the baby monster.

Generalized monstrous moonshine
Conway and Norton suggested in their 1979 paper that monstrous moonshine is not limited to the monster, but that similar phenomena may be found for other groups. Larissa Queen and others subsequently found that one can construct the expansions of many Hauptmoduln from simple combinations of dimensions of sporadic groups. For the Baby monster B or F2, the relevant McKay–Thompson series is  where one can set the constant term .

and η(τ) is the Dedekind eta function.

Maximal subgroups
 found the 30 conjugacy classes of maximal subgroups of B as follows:

 2.2E6(2):2  This is the centralizer of an involution, and is the subgroup fixing a point of the smallest permutation representation on 13 571 955 000 points. 
 21+22.Co2
 Fi23
 29+16.S8(2)
 Th
 (22 × F4(2)):2
 22+10+20.(M22:2 × S3)
 [230].L5(2)
 S3 × Fi22:2
 [235].(S5 × L3(2))
 HN:2
 O8+(3):S4
 31+8.21+6.U4(2).2
 (32:D8  × U4(3).2.2).2
 5:4 × HS:2
 S4 × 2F4(2)
 [311].(S4 × 2S4)
 S5 × M22:2
 (S6 × L3(4):2).2
 53.L3(5)
 51+4.21+4.A5.4
 (S6 × S6).4
 52:4S4 × S5
 L2(49).23
 L2(31)
 M11
 L3(3)
 L2(17):2
 L2(11):2
 47:23

References

External links
 MathWorld: Baby monster group
 Atlas of Finite Group Representations: Baby Monster group

Sporadic groups